In the Pope's Eye is a 1980 Italian comedy film written and directed by Renzo Arbore.

It was released in September 1980, and it was heavily attacked by the Catholic press. Three weeks later it was confiscated "for insulting the Catholic religion and the person of the Holy Pope" on the orders of the L'Aquila prosecutor Donato Massimo Bartolomei.

The film grossed 5 billion lire being the 5th best grossing film in Italy in the 1980/1981 season.

Plot
Musician Renzo Arbore has a vision of Don Gabriel, who comes bringing an Annunciation from the Vatican: Gabriel announces that Pope John Paul II, watching television, was impressed by a beer commercial in which Arbore was the spokesman.  Arbore is thus to be hired as the artistic director of the newly-formed but poorly organized Vatican State Television. Following this announcement, Arbore and his company arrive at the Vatican to begin work. Meanwhile, Cardinal Richelieu, a bigoted conservative prelate, plots to destroy the initiative and ruin Arbore.

Cast

 Renzo Arbore as Himself
 Roberto Benigni as Himself
 Isabella Rossellini as Herself
 Andy Luotto as Himself
  Mario Marenco as Himself
 Manfred Freyberger as Pope John Paul II
  Michael Pergolani as Himself
 Otto e Barnelli as Themselves
  Sorelle Bandiera as Themselves 
 Diego Abatantuono as Don Gabriele
 Luciano De Crescenzo as God
  Graziano Giusti as Cardinal Richelieu
 Fabrizio Zampa as Zampa
 Milly Carlucci as TV Announcing Nun 
 Mariangela Melato as Unchosen actress who plays "The Daughter of Iorio"
  Ruggero Orlando as Himself
 Martin Scorsese as TV Director
  Silvia Annichiarico as Arbore's Secretary

References

External links

Italian comedy films
1980 comedy films
1980 films
Films about television
Films about religion
Films about Pope John Paul II
Films set in Vatican City
1980s Italian-language films
1980s Italian films